Arandu Arakuaa is a Brazilian folk metal band formed in the country's capital, Brasília. It is noted for blending extreme heavy metal with Brazilian folk music, specifically indigenous tunes. Their lyrics also reflect indigenous cultures, referring to their myths and rites. Along with bands Aclla, Armahda, Cangaço, Hate Embrace, MorrigaM, Tamuya Thrash Tribe and Voodoopriest, they form the Levante do Metal Nativo (Native Metal Uprising), a movement gathering bands that mix heavy metal with typical musical elements from that country and/or write lyrics about it.

Guitarist and founder Zhândio Aquino claims to have been born and raised until the age of 24 near a Xerente territory, in the state of Tocantins, where he came in contact with indigenous music and Brazilian regional music namely (baião, catira, cantiga de roda, vaquejada, etc.). He cites Metallica and Black Sabbath as his influences from the metal side.

History 
Arandu Arakuaa means "knowledge of the sky cycles" or "cosmos knowledge" in Tupi-Guarani. They began in April 2008 when Zândhio Aquino started to compose songs in Ancient Tupi. After a few unsuccessful attempts with some musicians, the band finally established its final lineup between October 2010 and February 2011 as members Nájila Cristina, Adriano Ferreira and Saulo Lucena became part of the group.

In August 2011, the band performed its first show and released its first demo album in June 2012. Between February and April 2013, they recorded their debut album, Kó Yby Oré (this is our land), released later that year, in September.

Discography

EP 
 2012 - Arandu Arakuaa

Studio albums 
 2013 - Kó Yby Oré
 2015 - Wdê Nnãkrda
 2018 - Mrã Waze

Singles 
 2020 - "Waptokwa Zawré"

Videos 
 2013 - "Gûyrá"
 2014 - "Aruanãs"
 2015 - "Hêwaka Waktû"
 2016 - "Ipredu"

Members 
 Nájila Cristina – vocals, maracá
 Zândhio Aquino – guitar, viola caipira, tribal vocals, keyboards, maracá 
 Saulo Lucena – bass, backing vocals, maracá 
 Adriano Ferreira – drums, percussion

References 

Brazilian folk metal musical groups
Musical groups established in 2008